The Bomboras are an American all-instrumental surf band from Los Angeles, California, United States. The band was formed in the summer of 1994, sharing a love of 1960s surf and garage music such as The Ventures, Booker T, and The Sonics.

Donning Day of the Dead regalia onstage, the fivesome tempered their retro-stylings with an update by way of The Ramones, The Pandoras, and Nuggets. Accompanied by frenzied Go Go girls, spitting flames, stage-diving, and destroying their own equipment, the Bomboras’ livid funhouse take on surf rock became an object of fan adoration, albeit a worry to the local fire department.

The Bomboras took their name from a classic surf instrumental by the Original Surfaris (not to be confused with a different song with the same title, "Bombora," by the Australian surf combo The Atlantics) and released several albums on Burbank-based indie label Dionysus Records between 1995 and 1997. In summer 1997 Rob Zombie took notice of the band and signed them to his then newly formed Zombie a Go-Go label, which was distributed by Geffen Records. The Bomboras finally called it quits in 2000 with some of the members forming the Lords of Altamont and some members formed The Legendary Invisible Men. Drummer Dave Klein is currently playing drums with legendary surf/punk band Agent Orange and produces bands at Dave Klein Recording, his private studio in Los Angeles. On December 31, 2006, New Year's Eve of 2007, The Bomboras played a return show in Hollywood. The Bomboras played a full set of songs at The Wild'O Fest in Mexico City June 16, 2018. They also played a full show at "Tiki-Au-Go-Go" at The Warehouse Restaurant in Marina Del Rey, California on January 25, 2020.

Line up
Action Andy - bass/vocals
Von Franco - guitar
Dave Klein - drums
Shane "The Showman" Van Dyke - bass/vocals
Johnny DeVilla - guitar/vocals 
Gregg Lord Hunt - guitar/vocals
Jake Cavaliere - keys/vocals

Selected discography
Savage Island, 1995 The band's first album for Dionysius, Savage Island cost only $200 to make and was recorded in just two days.
Swingin' Singles!, 1996
Organ Grinder, 1995/1997
Starship Troopers, 1997
It Came from Pier 13!, 1997 The album was described by Stewart Mason on AllMusic as being "as good as neo-surf instrumental albums get"
Board Headz Movie, 1998
Head Shrinkin' Fun, 1998

References

External links
 The Bomboras MySpace page

Garage rock groups from California
Musical groups established in 1994
Musical groups disestablished in 2000
Surf music groups
Musical groups from Los Angeles
1994 establishments in California